East Bay  is a community in the Canadian province of Nova Scotia, located in the Cape Breton Regional Municipality on Cape Breton Island. It is situated on the south side of the East Bay of the Bras d'Or Lake, from which it gets its name.   East Bay has one public beach (East Bay Sandbar) and a large number of summer cottages with beach front property. Home of famous Fish & Chips, and East Bay Country Market, located on the Eskasoni turn off.

East Bay has a Catholic church, St. Mary of the Assumption Church, with mass every day at 10am and Saturday at 4pm. The community was the site of the College of East Bay (1824-1829) which was moved to Arichat and later Antigonish where it became St. Francis Xavier University. St FX later opened a branch in Cape Breton which became the University College of Cape Breton, later Cape Breton University.  Until recently, East Bay had two elementary schools, reduced to one, and now both closed.

References

 East Bay on Destination Nova Scotia

Communities in the Cape Breton Regional Municipality